Somatochlora septentrionalis, the muskeg emerald, is a species of dragonfly in the family Corduliidae. It is endemic to Canada, where it is found from Yukon and British Columbia east to Nova Scotia and Newfoundland.

Description
Adult muskeg emeralds are 39–48 mm long. The body is metallic green, brown and black, with a faint yellow spot on the thorax. This species is identical to Whitehouse's emerald (Somatochlora whitehousei) except in the shape of the male cerci and the female subgenital plate.

Life History
Muskeg emeralds occur in open fens with pools of open water. Males patrol over the pools, and females lay eggs by tapping in the open water and in floating vegetation. Adults fly from June to August.

References

Corduliidae
Endemic fauna of Canada